SOMA Digest is an English-written newspaper in the Kurdistan Region, Iraq.

Its printing offices are located in Baghdad and its press office in Sulaymaniyah. The paper was launched on February 14, 2006. It is issued on a fortnight basis and distributed across the whole of Iraq, reporting on Kurdish and Iraqi affairs. Apart from containing analyses of the region's main topics, it also includes interviews with leading officials.

The paper was named after soma, which means "perspective" in Kurdish. Its Managing Editor is Tanya Goudsouzian. It has a national circulation of 8,000 copies per issue. 

The paper has close affiliations with the Patriotic Union of Kurdistan (PUK).

Current columnists and journalists

Lawen Sagerma (Deputy Managing Editor) 
Dr. Sherko Abdullah (Columnist)
Dolamite Da Pimp (Cultural Advisor)
Agri Ismail (Columnist)
Dr. Joseph Kechichian (Columnist)
Raz Jabary (UK Correspondent & Representative, London)
Anwar M. Qaradaghi (Language Editor)
Ari Anwar
Zheno Abdulla
Jalal Ahmed
Noman Abdurrahman Ali
Iason Athanasiadis
Roj Bahjat
Karokh Bahjat
Linda Berglund
Ilnur Cevik (Ankara)
Troy Davis
Jonathan Dworkin
Dr. Rebwar Fatah (London)
Pat Gaffney (London)
Basit Gharib
Dr. Harry Hagopian (London)
Dana Hameed
Dr. Albert Issa
Fakhri Karim (Baghdad)
Ali Kurdistani
Ibrahim Al Marashi (Istanbul)
Mohamed Karim Mohamed
Hawre Daro Noori
Shadman Janab Noori
Jamal Penjweny
Asoz L. Rashid (Baghdad)
Dr. Latif Rashid (Baghdad)
Bakhtiar Sabir
Qubad Talabani (Washington, DC)
Ranj Talabany
Awat Abdullah
Darya Ibrahim (Reporter)
Hazhar Mohammed
Galawizh H. Rashid (Reporter)
Ako Gharib

Soma Digest on YouTube
On January 1, 2010, SOMA Digest launched its online video channel on YouTube, thus aiming to spread its voice to a wider range of fans through the use of short pieces of viewing material.

References

External links 
SOMA Digest Homepage 
Old editions in issuu
SOMA Digest on YouTube

Newspapers published in Iraq
Mass media in Kurdistan Region (Iraq)
Mass media in Sulaymaniyah
English-language newspapers published in Asia
Biweekly newspapers
2006 establishments in Iraqi Kurdistan
Publications established in 2006